R114 road may refer to:
 R114 road (South Africa)
 R114 road (Ireland)